Maaike Hartjes is a Dutch cartoonist and comics artist. She is the winner of the 2016 Stripschapprijs.

References

Living people
Year of birth missing (living people)
Dutch cartoonists
Dutch female comics artists
Winners of the Stripschapsprijs
Dutch women cartoonists
Place of birth missing (living people)